Jagoli Baba Mandir is one of the oldest temples in Champawat District in Uttarakhand State of India. 

The Oli dynasty worships here with their fourteen generation. The Kharwal Saheb priest since 8th generation. In the past whole Goshni, Tarsoun, Faraka with the adjacent of Simal Khet are worshiping here. 

In the 19th century this place is second center of freedom struggle after Almora. Lal Bhadur Shastri, Pandit Govind Ballabh Pant, Hargobind Pant, Badridutt Pandey, Madan Mohan Upadhyay assembled here. The most important person, who lived here was Swami Satyadev Paribrajhak.

References

Champawat district

Hindu temples in Uttarakhand